Louis Falcoz (1870, Gillonnay, Isère -1938, Villeurbanne) was a French naturalist  who specialised in entomology . He wrote Faune de France Volume n° 14 - Diptères pupipares. 1926, 64 p. Louis Falcoz was a Member of  the Société linnéenne de Lyon :fr:Société linnéenne de Lyon

References
Groll, E. K. (2017). Biographies of the Entomologists of the World. Online database, version 8. Senckenberg Deutsches Entomologisches Institut, Müncheberg
Publications de la Société Linnéenne de Lyon

French entomologists
1938 deaths
1870 births